The  is a dual-voltage electric multiple unit (EMU) train type operated by the Metropolitan Intercity Railway Company on the Tsukuba Express line in the Kanto region of Japan since 2005.

Design
TX-2000 series trains are capable of operating on both the 1,500 V DC and 20 kV AC sections of the Tsukuba Express, and therefore operate over the full length of the line. (The DC-only TX-1000 series sets are restricted to the Akihabara – Moriya section of the line.)

Formation
, the fleet consists of 23 six-car sets (51 to 73), consisting of four motored (M) cars and two trailer (T) cars, and formed as follows with car 1 at the Tsukuba (northern) end.

Cars 2 and 4 are each fitted with two single-arm pantographs.

Interior
The middle two cars, 3 and 4, feature transverse seating bays with folding tables.

History
The first six-car prototype was built in March 2003, and 15 more sets were subsequently delivered from Hitachi between January and July 2004, entering service on 24 August 2008. Four additional sets (67 to 70) were delivered in 2008 to provide increased capacity. These later sets differ in having a red bodyline stripe added below the windows.

A further three six-car sets were delivered in June and August 2012 to provide additional capacity. These three sets, 71 to 73, feature a number of design improvements over earlier sets, including the use of LED interior lighting, increased seat thickness, and opening windows to provide ventilation at the ends of cars.

From April 2017, the transverse seating in cars 3 and 4 was gradually replaced by longitudinal bench seating.

References

External links

 Tsukuba Express TX-2000 information 

Electric multiple units of Japan
2000 series
Hitachi multiple units
20 kV AC multiple units
1500 V DC multiple units of Japan